Slovakia competed at the 2022 Winter Olympics in Beijing, China, from 4 to 20 February 2022.

Marek Hrivík and Katarina Šimoňáková were the country's flagbearer during the opening ceremony. Meanwhile hockey player Peter Cehlárik was the flagbearer during the closing ceremony.

Vlhova's gold was the first ever alpine skiing medal for the nation. Also, the hockey team made headlines around the world after upsetting the USA in the quarterfinals.

Medalists 

The following Slovak competitors won medals at the games. In the discipline sections below, the medalists' names are bolded.

Competitors
The following is the list of number of competitors participating at the Games per sport/discipline.

Alpine skiing

Slovakia qualified two male and three female alpine skiers.

Men

Women

Mixed

Biathlon 

Men

Women

Mixed

Bobsleigh

Cross-country skiing

Slovakia qualified two male and three female cross-country skiers.

Distance

Sprint

Ice hockey

Summary
Key:
 OT – Overtime
 GWS – Match decided by penalty-shootout

Slovakia has qualified 25 male competitors to the ice hockey tournament.

Men's tournament

Slovakia men's national ice hockey team qualified by winning the final qualification tournament.

Team roster

Group play

Playoffs

Quarterfinals

Semifinals

Bronze medal game

Luge 

Mixed

Snowboarding 

Freestyle

References

Nations at the 2022 Winter Olympics
2022
Winter Olympics